The Bobby Burns is a whisky cocktail composed of scotch, vermouth and Bénédictine liqueur. It is served in a 4.5 US fl oz cocktail glass.

The drink is named for Robert Burns, the Scottish poet, but is not considered a national drink in the way the Rusty Nail is.

History

The original recipe comes from the 1900 edition of Fancy Drinks, published by Bishop & Babcock where it is called the "Baby Burns". The "Robert Burns" name appears in the 1910 Jack's Manual and 1914 Drinks made with Irish whiskey, vermouth and absinthe. In later publications it starts to be called by the more informal "Bobby Burns" name, with the original Irish whiskey recipe appearing in Recipes for Mixed Drinks (1917). The 1948 recipe from The Fine Art of Mixing Drinks replaced the Bénédictine with Drambuie (Scotch whisky) and bitters.

See also 
 List of cocktails

References

Cocktails with Scotch whisky